Roseville High School is a public high school in Roseville, Michigan in the Metro Detroit area, and serves grades 9-12. It is the only high school in the Roseville Community Schools district.

The high school was established in 1969 as Carl Brablec High School. It was renamed to Roseville High School in 1989 when it merged with the other high school in the city of Roseville.

Demographics
The demographic breakdown of the 1,518 students enrolled in 2015-2016 was:
Male - 53.1%
Female - 46.9%
Native American/Alaskan - 1.1%
Asian/Pacific islanders - 1.5%
Black - 33.9%
Hispanic - 1.7%
White - 58.2%
Multiracial - 3.6%

58.9% of the students were eligible for free or reduced-cost lunch.

Notable alumni
 Crystal Reed, actress/model

References

External links

Public high schools in Michigan

Schools in Macomb County, Michigan
1969 establishments in Michigan